The 1952 United States presidential election in North Dakota took place on November 4, 1952, as part of the 1952 United States presidential election. Voters chose four representatives, or electors, to the Electoral College, who voted for president and vice president.

North Dakota was won by Columbia University President Dwight D. Eisenhower (R–New York), running with California Senator Richard Nixon, with 70.97 percent of the popular vote, against Adlai Stevenson (D–Illinois), running with Alabama Senator John Sparkman, with 28.39 percent of the popular vote. , this is the last election in which a presidential candidate carried all of the counties in the state; Rolette County has not voted for a Republican presidential candidate since.

With 70.97 percent of the popular vote, North Dakota was Eisenhower's second strongest state after Vermont.

Results

Results by county

See also
 United States presidential elections in North Dakota

References

North Dakota
1952
1952 North Dakota elections